Encelia virginensis is a North American species of flowering plants in the family Asteraceae known by the common name Virgin River brittlebush. This shrub is native to the southwestern United States and northwestern Mexico, particularly the Mojave Desert and the Sonoran Desert. It has been found in Baja California, southern California, Nevada, Arizona, southwestern Utah, and southwestern New Mexico.

Encelia virginensis is a bushy, sprawling shrub reaching heights between 100 and 150 cm (40-60 inches). It has many branches, with the younger parts hairy and the older stems developing a thickened bark. The gray-green, fuzzy to hairy foliage may be sparse, appearing pale because of the presence of many small hairs on the surface. Atop many erect, hairy stems are solitary daisy-like flower heads with 11 to 21 ray florets which are generally yellow, and a center of yellow disc florets. The fruit is an achene 5 to 8 millimeters long and usually lacking a pappus.

Varieties
Encelia virginensis var. actonii (Elmer) B.L.Turner - California, Nevada, Baja California
Encelia virginensis var. virginensis - southern California, Nevada, Arizona, southwestern Utah, and southwestern New Mexico

References

External links

Calflora Database: Encelia virginensis (Virgin River brittlebush, Virgin River encelia)
Jepson Manual eFlora (TJM2) treatment of Encelia virginensis
USDA Plants Profile for Encelia virginensis (Virgin River brittlebush)
UC Calphotos gallery of Encelia virginensis

virginensis
Flora of the California desert regions
Flora of Baja California
Flora of New Mexico
Flora of the Southwestern United States
Natural history of the Mojave Desert
North American desert flora
Plants described in 1904
Taxa named by Aven Nelson
Flora without expected TNC conservation status